Sobarocephala is a genus of flies in the family Clusiidae. There are more than 110 described species in Sobarocephala.

See also
 List of Sobarocephala species

References

Further reading

External links

 

Schizophora genera
Articles created by Qbugbot
Clusiidae